Boyle Airport  is located  south of Boyle, Alberta, Canada.

References

External links
Page about this aerodrome on COPA's Places to Fly airport directory

Registered aerodromes in Alberta
Athabasca County